Chamaco is a masculine given name. Notable people with the name include:

Chamaco Ramirez (1941–1983), Puerto Rican singer and composer
Chamaco Rivera (born 1946), Puerto Rican singer and composer
Chamaco Valaguez (born 1957), Mexican wrestler

Masculine given names